Dioxamycin is a benz[a] anthraquinone antibiotic and kinase inhibitor with the molecular formula C38H40O15. Dioxamycin is produced by the bacterium Streptomyces cocklensis and Streptomyces xantholiticus.

References

Further reading 

 

Streptomyces
Antibiotics
Anthraquinones
Carboxylic acids
Dioxolanes